Matsuzaki Station is the name of two train stations in Japan:

 Matsuzaki Station (Fukuoka)
 Matsuzaki Station (Tottori)